Whigfield is the debut studio album by Italian Eurodance project Whigfield which was performed by Danish-born Sannie Charlotte Carlson, released in June 1995. It features Whigfield's biggest hit single, "Saturday Night", which reached number one in several European countries. 

Six singles were released from the album; "Saturday Night", "Another Day", "Think of You", "Close to You", "Big Time" and "Sexy Eyes".

Releases
The album was released in many countries in 1995, while in Australia it was released in 1997. In Japan, the album was titled Saturday Night – Let's Whiggy Dance. The Netherlands received a 2-CD version where the first disc contained remixes and a bonus song, while the second disc featured the original album. In Canada, it featured three additional remixes, the latter being the Megamix.

In Singapore it was called Sexy Eyes – The Album.

In South Korea it was called Big Time – The Album.

In Taiwan it was called Superbox – Super Hits & Remix Collection. It features two discs, one including the tracks from the Whigfield album as well as the tracks "Junto A Ti" and "Gimme Gimme". The second disc included various remixes and had its own cover titled Superbox – Remix Collection.

Some versions (in particular special editions) contained Whigfield's versions of "Last Christmas" and "It's Alright".

Critical reception
Caroline Sullivan from The Guardian commented, "Now that Kylie Minogue has attained respectability, this Danish ex-model replaces her as the main perpetrator of impersonal Eurodisco. "Saturday Night", the UK's second-biggest-selling single of 1994, here in its tinny glory, is the best thing on the album. Worst is: take your pick - I'm particularly partial to the stuttering "Sexy Eyes"." Pan-European magazine Music & Media wrote, "Here you get the numbers A1-A10 on jukeboxes in mediterranean holiday resorts this summer and way beyond. The button on the old but reliable Wurlitzer corresponding with current single "Think of You" will be pressed most. Also keep your finger on the Ace of Base-like pop reggae tune "Big Time"." A reviewer from Music Week said, "Pulling together all of the hit singles and a few more besides, Whigfield's debut album should attract a few interested parties and prove she's no one hit wonder."

Track listing
Standard version
"Think of You" (music: A. Pignagnoli/D. Riva; lyrics: A. Gordon) – 4:16
"Another Day" (music: Pignagnoli/Riva; lyrics: Gordon) – 4:07
"Don't Walk Away" (music: Pignagnoli/Riva; lyrics: Gordon) – 4:01	
"Big Time" (music: Pignagnoli/Riva; lyrics: Gordon/P. Sears) – 3:24
"Out of Sight" (music: Pignagnoli/Riva; lyrics: Gordon/P. Sears) – 4:02
"Close to You" (music: A. Pignagnoli/D. Riva/A. Gordon) – 4:12
"Sexy Eyes" (music: Pignagnoli/Riva; lyrics: Gordon/P. Sears) – 3:55
"Ain't It Blue" (music: Pignagnoli/Riva; lyrics: Gordon/P. Sears) – 4:46	
"I Want to Love" (music: Pignagnoli/Riva; lyrics: Gordon/P. Sears) – 4:19	
"Saturday Night" (music: A. Pignagnoli/D. Riva;lyrics: Pagnagnoli) – 3:46

Charts

Weekly charts

Year-end charts

References

External links

Whigfield albums
1995 albums
1995 debut albums
London Records albums